Cestonionerva is a genus of flies in the family Tachinidae.

Species
Cestonionerva latigena Villeneuve, 1939
Cestonionerva petiolata (Villeneuve, 1910)
Cestonionerva punctata Kugler, 1980

References

Tachinidae genera
Exoristinae
Taxa named by Joseph Villeneuve de Janti
Diptera of Asia